The 1990 United States Senate election in Oklahoma was held November 6, 1990 to elect a member of the United States Senate to represent the State of Oklahoma as well as other elections to the United States Senate in other states and elections to the United States House of Representatives and various state elections. The primaries were held August 28.

Incumbent Democratic U.S. Senator David Boren won re-election to a third term in a landslide over challenger Stephen Jones, carrying every county in the state with more than 60% of the vote. As of 2022, this remains the last time that a Democrat has won a U.S. Senate election in Oklahoma. Boren later resigned his seat in 1994 to become president of the University of Oklahoma.

Democratic primary

General election

See also
 1990 United States Senate elections

Notes

References

1990
Oklahoma
United States Senate